Henry Calderón (born 19 April 1993) is a Chilean footballer that currently plays for the Chilean club General Velásquez as a striker.

Career

Youth career

Name started his career at Primera División de Chile club O'Higgins. He progressed from the under categories club all the way to the senior team.

O'Higgins

Calderón won the Apertura 2013-14 with O'Higgins, in the 2013–14 Súper Final Apertura against Universidad Católica, being the first title for O'Higgins.

On 2014, he is signed for General Velásquez.

Honours

Club
O'Higgins
Primera División: Apertura 2013-14

Individual

O'Higgins
Medalla Santa Cruz de Triana: 2014

References

External links
 Henry Calderón at Football-Lineups
 
 

1993 births
Living people
Chilean footballers
O'Higgins F.C. footballers
Chilean Primera División players
Association football forwards